Callichlamys may refer to:
 Callichlamys (planthopper), a genus of planthoppers in the family Achilidae
 Callichlamys (plant), a genus of plants in the family Bignoniaceae